Venus, Mars and Cupid is a c.1490 oil on panel painting by Piero di Cosimo. It is currently held in the Gemäldegalerie art museum in Berlin, Germany. It probably originated as part of a decorated cassone.

Its neo-Platonic subject echoes that of Sandro Botticelli's Venus and Mars (1482-1483; National Gallery, London). The god of war Mars sleeps in a post-coital slumber, conquered by the nude Venus, making both works an allegory of Love triumphing over War. Venus plays with her son Cupid, with her symbolic doves in front of Mars. In the background a group of putti in the foreground play with Mars' weapons and armour between bushes of myrtle, Venus' plant, where she had taken refuge after her birth off Cyprus.

Details

References

Paintings by Piero di Cosimo
1490 paintings
Paintings in the Gemäldegalerie, Berlin
Paintings of Venus
Paintings of Mars (mythology)